Death metal is an extreme subgenre of heavy metal.

Death metal may  also refer to:

 Dark Nights: Death Metal, 2020 crossover event of DC Comics
 Death Metal (Dismember album), 1998
 Death Metal (split album), a 1984 split album by the bands Helloween, Hellhammer, Running Wild and Dark Avenger
 Death Metal (comics), a character from the Marvel UK imprint of Marvel Comics
 Death Metal Angola, 2012 Portuguese film
 D>E>A>T>H>M>E>T>A>L, a 2000 song and EP by the English shoegaze band Panchiko